The "Brazilian Flag Anthem" ("Hymn to the National Flag") is a Brazilian patriotic song dedicated to the national flag of Brazil.

History
The song's lyrics were written by poet Olavo Bilac, and the music composed by Francisco Braga, at the request of the then mayor of Rio de Janeiro, Francisco Pereira Passos. The anthem was presented for the first time on November 9, 1906, and was originally intended to be sung by the schoolchildren of Rio de Janeiro during flag replacement ceremonies in the city's schools. Hence the reference to "youthful chest" in the lyrics. Around that same time, the anthem was considered as a possible replacement for the Brazilian National Anthem, that at that time had no official lyrics.

The Flag Anthem (as all other patriotic anthems and songs) was highly praised in the past, especially during the military dictatorship of 1964–1985, but has since lost some of its appeal. It is still performed on November 19 (Flag Day), as well as in flag replacement ceremonies.

Protocol

Flag replacement ceremonies (held in military institutions, in schools, etc., and periodically also at the Praça dos Três Poderes in Brasília, the capital of Brazil, to replace the flag that hovers over the seat of the Brazilian government), usually consist of the Flag Anthem being played while the old flag is lowered, and the National Anthem being played while the new flag is raised. In the case of perpetual displays of the flag (places where the national flag is always displayed without even minimal interruptions), such as the case of the aforementioned flag in the Praça dos Três Poderes, the new flag is raised first, while the national anthem is played, and only then the old flag is lowered, while the Flag Anthem is sung.

Lyrics

Portuguese lyrics
Salve, lindo pendão da esperança!
Salve, símbolo augusto da paz!
Tua nobre presença à lembrança
A grandeza da Pátria nos traz.

Chorus
Recebe o afeto que se encerra
Em nosso peito juvenil,
Querido símbolo da terra,
Da amada terra do Brasil!

Em teu seio formoso retratas
Este céu de puríssimo azul,
A verdura sem par destas matas,
E o esplendor do Cruzeiro do Sul.
(Chorus)

Contemplando o teu vulto sagrado,
Compreendemos o nosso dever,
E o Brasil por seus filhos amado,
Poderoso e feliz há de ser!
(Chorus)

Sobre a imensa nação brasileira,
Nos momentos de festa ou de dor,
Paira sempre, sagrada bandeira,
Pavilhão da justiça e do amor!
(Chorus)
 
Hail, precious banner of hope!
Hail, august symbol of peace!
Thy noble presence to our minds
The greatness of our motherland does bring.

Chorus
Take the affection enclosed
In our youthful chest,
Dear symbol of the land,
Of the beloved land of Brazil!

In thy beauteous bosom thou portrayest
This sky of purest blue,
The peerless greenness of these forests,
And the splendor of the Southern Cross.
(Chorus)

Beholding thy sacred shadow,
We understand our duty,
And Brazil, loved by its children,
Powerful and happy shall be!
(Chorus)

Over the immense Brazilian Nation,
In times of happiness or grief,
Hover always, o sacred flag,
Pavilion of justice and love!
(Chorus)

See also 

"Brazilian National Anthem"
"Brazilian Republic Anthem"
Hino da Independência
Flag of Brazil

References

External links 

"Hino à Bandeira", ingeb.org

Portuguese-language songs
1906 songs
Flag anthems
Flag
Anthem